Jhundpura is a town and a nagar panchayat in Morena district, in the Chambal Division, in the Indian state of Madhya Pradesh.

Demographics
 India census, Jhundpura had a population of 8,110. Males constitute 55% of the population and females 45%. Jhundpura has an average literacy rate of 49%, lower than the national average of 59.5%: male literacy is 62%, and female literacy is 32%. In Jhundpura, 19% of the population is under 6 years of age.

References

Cities and towns in Morena district
Morena